4-Hydroxy-5-methoxydimethyltryptamine, also known as 4-HO-5-MeO-DMT or psilomethoxin, is a novel psychedelic drug. It is the 4-hydroxy counterpart of 5-MeO-DMT, or the 5-methoxy counterpart of psilocin.

It is a psychedelic tryptamine but very little is known about it. The only report of it in the chemical literature was a paper published by Marc Julia's group at the Pasteur Institute in 1965.  This paper reports a 10 step synthesis of 4-HO-5-MeO-DMT from ortho-vanillin. However, Alexander Shulgin has explained that it could be possible to cultivate 4-HO-5-MeO-DMT in psilocybin mushrooms by adding 5-MeO-DMT to the growing substrate of the fungus. This method was allegedly tested with 5-MeO-DMT by members of the Church of Psilomethoxin in 2021 but not proven, and had previously been used successfully for changing DET into 4-HO-DET and 4-PO-DET, both of which had never before been found in nature.

Legality 

In the United States, 4-HO-5-MeO-DMT may be considered illegal under the Federal Analogue Act if sold or used for consumption due to structural relation to psilocin and 5-MeO-DMT, which are both listed as  Schedule I controlled substances under the Controlled Substances Act of 1970.

The word "PSILOMETHOXIN" has been trademarked in the United States under code 045.

Religious use 
Psilomethoxin is used as a religious sacrament by the Church of Psilomethoxin, created by the non-profit corporation Church of the Sacred Synthesis based in Texas. which has also trademarked the word "PSILOMETHOXIN" for "Religious and spiritual services, namely, providing gatherings and retreats to develop and enhance the spiritual lives of individuals" filed under "045 - Legal services; security services for the protection of property and individuals; personal and social services rendered by others to meet the needs of individuals."

References

External links 
Ask Dr. Shulgin
Reddit Psilomethoxin is Real

Entheogens
Tryptamines
Psychedelic drugs